The Coal Mines Act 1911 amended and consolidated legislation in the United Kingdom related to collieries. A series of mine disasters in the 19th and early-20th centuries had led to commissions of enquiry and legislation to improve mining safety. The 1911 Act, sponsored by Winston Churchill, was passed by the Liberal government of H. H. Asquith. It built on earlier regulations and provided for many improvement to safety and other aspects of the coal mining industry. An important aspect was that mine owners were required to ensure there were mines rescue stations near each colliery with equipped and trained staff. Although amended several times, it was the main legislation governing coal mining for many years.

Background

In the United Kingdom a series of disasters in the 19th century brought about Royal Commissions which developed the idea of improving mine safety.
In 1906 a major explosion at a colliery in Courrières, northern France, caused the deaths of more than 1,000 miners. 
The subsequent report blamed the accidental ignition of firedamp, exacerbated by coal dust in the air. 
Concerned that a similar disaster might happen in British collieries, the Royal Commission was formed, reporting back in 1907, 1909 and 1911.
On 9 April 1908 an explosion at Norton Hill Collieries at Westfield approximately  underground killed 10 men and boys. 
As there were no mine rescue teams at that time, the manager and volunteers searched for survivors for 10 days.

The civil servant Malcolm Delevingne had a significant influence on safety regulations in factories and mines.
He did a considerable amount of work on the Coal Mines Act, 1911.
Richard Redmayne joined the Home Office as the first Chief Inspector of Mines in 1908 and worked with Delevingne to bring about the Act 1911.
The Royal Commission reports led to the Coal Mines Act 1911, which came force into December that year.

Enactment

Winston Churchill was instrumental in the passing of the Coal Mines Act 1911.
Implemented by the Liberal government of H. H. Asquith, it was the culmination of legislation enacted in the 19th century.
The Act amended and consolidated the law related to coal mines, including the Act of 1887 and subsequent regulations. 
It embodied legislation in the United Kingdom regarding the management of mines, safety provisions, health, accidents, regulations, employment, inspectors and other subjects. 
The Act and other reforms by the Liberal government had the effect of weakening the Labour Party's independence. 
The Labour Party had to support the Liberal reforms, and was therefore criticised by revolutionary socialists and syndicalists.

The Act was the main statute regulating mining health and safety in the period between World War I (1914–18) and World War II (1939–45).
Under the Act the government could introduce new safety regulations without seeking legislative approval.
The 1911 Act was followed by a series of acts to further improve working practices including the Coal Mines (Minimum Wage Act) 1912, Coal Mines Act General Regulations 1913, Coal Mines Act 1914 and Coal Mines Act 1919. The acts made working conditions safer and less arduous, and also improved productivity.

Safety provisions

A Royal Commission of 1886 had recommended that rescue stations be created, but they were not made compulsory until the 1911 Act.
The Act required all mine owners to establish rescue stations, provide teams of trained rescuers, and to keep and maintain rescue apparatus.
In 1912 the government revised the regulations concerning ambulances and rescue apparatus, and the training of their operators.
There had to be a rescue station within  of any mine with more than 100 employees. That limit was raised to  a few years later. 
The result was a rapid increase in the number of rescue stations between 1911 and 1918. 
By 1918 there were ten Scheme "A" stations with permanent full-time rescue teams, and 36 Scheme "B" stations with officers and instructors who trained miners in rescue.

Henry Fleuss developed a form of self-contained breathing apparatus that was used after an explosion at Seaham Colliery in 1881. 
The apparatus was further developed by Siebe Gorman into the Proto rebreather. 
In 1908 the Proto apparatus was chosen in a trial of equipment from several manufacturers to select the most efficient apparatus for use underground at Howe Bridge Mines Rescue Station.
It became the standard in rescue stations set up after the Act of 1911.

The 1911 Act required mine operators to guard against coal dust explosions, but did not dictate the approach to be taken.
After an explosion at Senghenydd in South Wales in 1913 Home Secretary Reginald McKenna and the employers yielded to a demand by the Miners' Federation of Great Britain (MFGB) for a special court of inquiry with representation from miners and employers. The inquiry did not establish the cause of the explosion but did find that the company had failed to comply with the Act's requirement to install reversible fans and to measure underground air currents.
The Act stated that fans should operate continuously while colliers were working on the face.
Failure to observe this rule was one of the causes of an explosion at Wharncliffe Silkstone in May 1914 that caused twelve deaths.

Other provisions

The 1911 Act granted miners an eight-hour day.
No boy aged under 14 could be employed below ground unless they had been working below ground before the Act was passed. 
Boys under 16 could not be employed above ground at night, although they could be employed underground.
The Act brought in strict regulations to provide for the general welfare of pit ponies working in the mines, although the use of ponies would continue for many years.

The Act provided that a manager or under-manager had to personally supervise each mine on a daily basis.
It established the Mining Qualifications Board to ensure that colliery managers and under-managers, firemen, deputies and shot-firers who would be wholly or partly responsible for mining safety were suitably qualified, and to issue certificates of competence.
Mine owners were required to secure disused or abandoned mine openings against accidental entry.
The Act §97(1) specified that Welsh-speakers in Wales would be preferred as inspectors of mines in Wales, but the Mines Department did not take this rule seriously.

Notes

Sources

 

United Kingdom Acts of Parliament 1911
December 1911 events
Coal mining in the United Kingdom
Coal mining law
Winston Churchill
H. H. Asquith